The 2003–04 Magyar Kupa (English: Hungarian Cup) was the 64th season of Hungary's annual knock-out cup football competition.

Quarter-finals
Games were played on March 17, 2004.

|}

Semi-finals
Games were played on April 14, 2004.

|}

Final

See also
 2003–04 Nemzeti Bajnokság I
 2003–04 Nemzeti Bajnokság II

References

External links
 Official site 
 soccerway.com

2003–04 in Hungarian football
2003–04 domestic association football cups
2003-04